Kateryna Valeriyivna Serdyuk (born January 22, 1983) is a Ukrainian archer.

She won a silver medal in the team competition at the 2000 Summer Olympics. In the individual event she placed 16th.

References
Profile at Database Olympics

1983 births
Living people
Ukrainian female archers
Archers at the 2000 Summer Olympics
Olympic archers of Ukraine
Olympic silver medalists for Ukraine
Olympic medalists in archery
Medalists at the 2000 Summer Olympics
21st-century Ukrainian women